Stefanie Stappenbeck (born 11 April 1974) is a German actress. She has appeared in more than 100 films and television shows since 1986.

Selected filmography
 September (2003)
 Barfuss (2005)
 1½ Knights – In Search of the Ravishing Princess Herzelinde (2008)

References

External links

1974 births
Living people
German film actresses
People from Potsdam